Hornsea Wind Farm is a Round 3 wind farm which began construction in 2018.

The development has been split into a number of subzones. The 1.2 GW Project 1 gained planning consent in 2014. Construction of Hornsea One started in January 2018, and the first turbines began supplying power to the UK national electricity grid in February 2019. The turbines were all installed by October 2019 and the equipment fully commissioned in December 2019.  With a capacity of 1,218 MW, it was the largest in the world on its completion. 

A second 1.4 GW Project 2 was given planning consent in 2016. First power was achieved in December 2021, and it became fully operational in August 2022 overtaking Hornsea One as the largest offshore wind farm in the world.

In 2016 a third subzone was split into two projects Hornsea 3 and 4, with approximate capacities of 1–2 GW and 1 GW, increasing the capacity of the developed project to a maximum of 6 GW.

History
The tendering process for Round 3 offshore wind farm opportunities was begun by the Crown Estate in 2008. Bids were received in March 2009, and Zone Development Agreements signed in December 2009. The Hornsea development zone was awarded to a joint venture (SMart Wind) of Siemens and a consortium Mainstream Renewable Power including Hochtief. The development had an estimated potential generating capacity of 4 GW.

The Hornsea site is one of three off the British coast in the North Sea, roughly halfway between the other two: Dogger Bank Wind Farm and East Anglia Wind Farm. The surface of the seabed consists primarily of sands and gravel.

In 2011 the Danish firm Ørsted A/S (then named DONG Energy) became a partner in SMart Wind. In early 2015 Ørsted A/S became the 100% owner of the first phase, Project 1, of the scheme. Ørsted acquired rights to the remaining subzones of the Hornsea development (2 & 3) by August 2015.

In 2016 Ørsted reached an agreement with the Crown Estate for amended plans for the Hornsea Two and Hornsea Three phases. Hornsea Three was split into two new projects, Hornsea Three and Hornsea Four; the new phases were expected to be developed in the 2020s. The changes increased the potential generating capacity of the wind farm to 6 GW, with Hornsea Three estimated at 1–2 GW and Hornsea Four at about 1 GW.

Hornsea Project 1
The zone was to connect to an existing 400 kV National Grid substation at Killingholme. A variety of configurations were considered – foundations of pile jacket, monopile or gravity base; turbines from 3.6 to 8 MW rated power; with electrical power export by HVDC. Later DONG Energy added the consideration to use HVAC export cables.

Project 1 water depths were generally .

In 2011 Smart Wind signed lease agreements with the Crown Estate for "Heron Wind" and "Njord" areas making up the zone. The zone was given provisional contract for difference renewable subsidies by the UK government in April 2014. Hornsea Project 1 was given planning consent in December 2014. The 'contract for difference' strike price was £140 per MWh. In early 2015 DONG acquired all of the project, becoming 100% owner.

Seabed investigation including boreholes at turbine foundation positions was completed by Fugro by April 2015. In mid 2015 DONG selected Siemens Wind Power 7 MW turbines with  rotor turbines for the project – around 171 turbines would be used for the wind farm. In its 2015 financial report DONG stated it had chosen to use suction bucket foundations on a third of the turbines at Hornsea. The rationale for use of the new foundation type is thought to be a simplified foundation installation, requiring only a heavy-lift crane to lower the foundation to the sea bed, reducing costs.

DONG Energy formally committed to building the wind farm in early 2016. The expected completion date for the project was 2020. A £25 million contract to construct the onshore substation at North Killingholme had been awarded to Balfour Beatty in late 2015.

NKT Cables and ABB were awarded €139 (c. $158) million and $250 million contracts to supply 220 kV AC export cables in March/April 2016.
Bladt Industries/Offshore Structures (Britain) Ltd. was awarded a contract for 96 tower transition pieces in early 2017, to be constructed at Aalborg, Denmark and Billingham, UK.

Construction
Construction of the onshore cable route was begun in late 2016 under J. Murphy & Sons.
The wind farm was scheduled to be constructed between 2018 and 2020, and expected to provide an annual production of around 4.1 terawatt-hours (TWh).

The first foundation of the new windpark was installed by DEME Group's subsidiary GeoSea in January 2018.
The export cables were installed by Tideway Offshore Solutions, a subsidiary company of the Belgian DEME Group. The installation was completed in December 2018, several months ahead of schedule.

Hornsea 1 began supplying power to the UK national electricity grid in February 2019, with full completion expected in the first quarter of 2020.
The final monopile foundation was completed in April 2019 and as of 3 May 2019, 28 turbines out of 174 had been installed.

The final turbine was installed in October 2019 and the project was completed in early 2020.

Events
In 2019 the failure of the plant was partially responsible for a large scale nationwide power cut on the evening of 9 August.

At 16:52:33 on Friday 9 August 2019, lightning struck a 400 kV mainland transmission line between Eaton Socon and Wymondley north of London, causing small generators, Little Barford Power Station (641 MW) and Hornsea (737 MW) to unexpectedly disconnect a combined 1,878 MW (1,691 MW maximum single-time) supply within minutes, greater than the 1,000 MW limit. Grid frequency declined, initially below the 'exceptional circumstances' limit at 49.5 Hz, triggering additional generation and then more importantly below 48.8 Hz at which point the first stage of ‘Low Frequency Demand Disconnection’ (LFDD) a form of automatic load shedding commences to stabilise the grid. As part of this 1.1 million customers were disconnected; rail services were disrupted with 371 trains cancelled, 220 part cancelled, and 873 trains delayed. Power was restored at 17:37. Hornsea disconnected due to a software flaw, which was fixed the next day.

Hornsea Project 2

A scoping report for "Project Two" was published in October 2012. The subzone was expected to be developed in a number of phases, with a potential wind turbine capacity of 1.8 GW, in an area of around  located in the centre of the Hornsea wind farm zone. Project 2 was use the same route for its electrical export cable as Project One, and to use either HVAC or HVDC with a separate onshore substation. Suitable areas for the Project 2 development were identified as being adjacent to the north, east or west of the Zone 1, which was located in the shallowest area of the whole Hornsea zone. The design considered piled, suction pile, monopile or gravity base foundations for wind turbines of 5 to 15 MW rated power.

In 2013 SMart wind signed lease agreements with the Crown Estate for the "Optimus Wind" and "Breesea" areas making up Project 2 of Hornsea wind farm. A planning application for Project 2 was submitted and accepted for examination in early 2015; its wind turbine area was located adjacent northwest of the Project 1 area, with the cable export route following that of Project 1 adjacent on the northward side. Planning permission for the development was awarded in August 2016, for 300 turbines covering  at a height of  each. At the time of the award, Dong had committed to building 174 turbines, but the whole project is the biggest marine wind farm in the world.

The inter-array cables were supplied by JDR Cable Systems, installed by Seaway 7, and operate at 66 kV.

Construction
By the time construction commenced in 2020, the selected area was to the east and north of Hornsea One and the specification had been set as 165 8 MW turbines giving a rated capacity of 1.4 GW. As of April 2021, a third of the turbine foundations had been installed and the remaining turbines are set to be installed during the second half of 2021. 

The first turbine was in place by the end of May 2021, and on 23 June 2021 Ørsted announced that the 16th turbine to be added to the Hornsea Two array was the 1,000th turbine they had installed in UK waters, fifteen years after they installed their first, which was part of the 30-turbine Barrow Offshore Wind Farm, off the coast of Cumbria. Hornsea Two has two diesel-electric crew ships. Having completed the offshore substation, first power was achieved by 20 December 2021, and became fully operational in August 2022. By doing so, Hornsea Project 2 overtook Hornsea One as the largest offshore wind farm in the world.

Hornsea Project 3
DONG Energy (which in November 2017 changed its name to Ørsted) began consultation on the project's development in May 2016. Ørsted submitted a Development consent application in 2018 and consent was granted on 31 December 2020. In early 2023, consent was also given to a battery storage power station at Swardeston. The project is expected to begin construction in 2022, and be completed by 2025.

Environmental impact
Concerns have been raised by the RSPB over the impact on bird colonies in the region.

Hornsea Project 4
Ørsted put forward a plan to add a fourth area to the Hornsea wind farm in 2018, with the area covering , and being located adjacent, north-west of Hornsea Project 1. During 2018 and 2019, consultation with the local communities which will be affected by the project occurred, with a Development Consent Order application originally intended in the first quarter of 2020. However additional consultations and revisions delayed the submission until September 2021, with further analysis needed on the impacts to kittiwake, razorbill and guillemot populations in the Flamborough and Filey Coast Special Protection Area. Part of the site is also scheduled for an underground carbon dioxide storage, leading to conflict over the use of the seabed and the ocean surface.

Construction of the wind farm was provisionally expected to start in 2023, and be operational by 2027, at the earliest. The project's capacity is unknown by Ørsted due to the ever increasing size of available wind turbines for the project.

See also
 List of offshore wind farms

Notes

References

Sources

 
 
 

Zone 1
 
 
 
 

Zone 2

External links

 
 
 
 

Proposed wind farms in England
Offshore wind farms in the North Sea
Round 3 offshore wind farms
Ørsted (company) wind farms
Hornsea
2018 establishments in England
Nationally Significant Infrastructure Projects (United Kingdom)
Energy infrastructure completed in 2021